Take London is the fifth studio album by The Herbaliser. It was released on Ninja Tune in 2005.

Critical reception
John Bush of AllMusic gave the album 3.5 stars out of 5, saying, "Ninja Tune fans may not have wished to hear a crucial production unit like the Herbaliser going down the same road already traveled by the Cinematic Orchestra and Chris Bowden, but the talents of all involved (especially [Jake] Wherry and [Ollie] Teeba) put this record over the top."

Track listing

Charts

References

External links
 

2005 albums
The Herbaliser albums
Ninja Tune albums